Ohn Win (born 11 November 1951) is a Burmese forester and incumbent Minister for the Ministry of Natural Resources and Environmental Conservation (Myanmar). Prior to his appointment as the Minister, he served in the Forest Department in various capacities. He was also a professor, and later pro-rector, at the University of Forestry (Yezin).

Early life and education 
Ohn Win was born on 11 November 1951 to Sein Htun and Tin Myint in Kyetsha village, located on Pyinkhayaing Island in Ngapudaw Township, Burma (now Myanmar).

Ohn Win graduated from the Yangon Arts and Science University (Yangon University) in 1976 with a Bachelor of Science (B.Sc) degree in Forestry. He also studied at the University of the Philippines Los Baños and obtained his master degree from the Colorado State University in the United States

Career
He had held highest-level appointed administrative post Pro-Rector at the University of Forestry (UoF) in Yezin until 2011. Prior to this, he served subsequently in several high level positions as Director of the Planning and Statistic Department at the Ministry of Forestry, Director of the Forest Research Institute (FRI) in Yezin, and Director the Shan State Forest Department and Mon State Forest Department.
Following the military coup in Myanmar on 1st February 2021, U Ohn Win was arrested and later charged by the military junta under section 55 of the anti-corruption law.

Personal life 
Ohn Win is married to San San Htay, and has three children, Mala Win (also known as Mala Nwe), Nila Win, and Thanda Win.

References 

1951 births
Living people
Government ministers of Myanmar
University of Yangon alumni
Colorado State University alumni
University of the Philippines Los Baños alumni